Pilot season may refer to:

 Pilot season (television), the time of year television pilots are often shown.
 Pilot Season (comics), a comic book series from Top Cow Productions.
 Pilot Season (TV series), a six episode 2004 series by Sam Seder.